Virupaksha Raya (born 1365, reign 1404–1405 CE) was an emperor of the Vijayanagara Empire.

With the death of Harihara II in 1404, the throne for the Vijayanagara Empire was disputed amongst his sons: Deva Raya I, Bukka Raya II, and Virupaksha Raya.  Virupaksha Raya would only rule for a few months before being murdered by his sons and then being succeeded by his brother Bukka Raya II. Bukka Raya II then ruled for two years before he himself was succeeded by his brother Deva Raya I.

As his rule was only for a few months, Virupaksha's reign was not marked with any significant events or changes. Still, it is noted by the traveler Fernao Nuniz that Virupaksha Raya lost a lot of the kingdom's land such as Goa, Chaul, and Dabhol to the Muslims. Nuniz also wrote that Virupaksha himself was cruel, "caring for nothing but women and to fuddle himself with drink".

External links
https://web.archive.org/web/20051219170139/http://www.aponline.gov.in/quick%20links/HIST-CULT/history_medieval.html
http://www.ourkarnataka.com/states/history/historyofkarnataka40.htm

1405 deaths
1404 births
Indian Hindus
Hindu monarchs
Sangama dynasty
Murdered Indian monarchs
15th-century Indian monarchs
15th-century murdered monarchs